Tom Segev (born March 1, 1945) is an Israeli historian, author and journalist. He is associated with Israel's New Historians, a group challenging many of the country's traditional narratives.

Biography
Segev was born in Jerusalem. His parents, Ricarda (née Meltzer) and Heinz Schwerin were artists who had met at the Bauhaus art school and fled Nazi Germany in 1935 due to their Communist orientation (Heinz was also Jewish). His mother was a photographer; his father, an architect and toy manufacturer, was killed on guard duty in Jerusalem in  the 1948 Arab–Israeli War. Segev's first language was German; his mother never learned Hebrew beyond a basic level. He earned a BA in history and political science from the Hebrew University of Jerusalem and a PhD in history from Boston University in the 1970s.  His sister is the German politician Jutta Oesterle-Schwerin.

Journalism career
Segev worked during the 1970s as a correspondent for Maariv in Bonn. He was a visiting professor at Rutgers University (2001–2002), the University of California at Berkeley (2007) and Northeastern University, where he taught a course on Holocaust denial. He writes a weekly column for the newspaper Haaretz. His books have appeared in fourteen languages.

In The Seventh Million: The Israelis and the Holocaust (1993), Segev explores the decisive impact of the Holocaust on the identity, ideology and politics of Israel. Although controversial, it was praised by Elie Wiesel in the Los Angeles Times Book Review.

In One Palestine, Complete: Jews and Arabs Under the British Mandate, a New York Times Editor's Choice Best Book (2000) and a recipient of a National Jewish Book Award in the Israel category, Segev describes the era of the British Mandate in Palestine (1917–1948).

Segev's history of the social and political background of the Six-Day War, 1967: Israel, the War, and the Year That Transformed the Middle East (2006) states that there was no existential threat to Israel from a military point of view. Segev also doubts that the Arab neighbours would have really attacked Israel. Still, large segments of the Israeli population had a real fear that the Egyptians and Syrians would eliminate them. That fear pressured the Israeli government in such a way that it opted for a pre-emptive attack. The Jordanian army's attack on West Jerusalem provided a pretext to invade East Jerusalem, according to Segev. Even though the occupation of East Jerusalem was not politically planned, the author considers that it was always desired.

In February 2018, Segev published a biography of David Ben-Gurion.

Published works
 1949: The First Israelis (Hebrew: 1984, ; English: 1998)
 Soldiers of Evil: The Commandants of the Nazi Concentration Camps (1988)
 One Palestine, Complete: Jews and Arabs Under the British Mandate (2000)
 The Seventh Million: Israelis and the Holocaust (2000)
 Elvis in Jerusalem: Post-Zionism and the Americanization of Israel (2003)
 Israel in 1967. And the land changed its visage (Hebrew: 2005)
 1967: Israel, the War, and the Year That Transformed the Middle East, Metropolitan Books (2006)
 Simon Wiesenthal: The Life and Legends, Jonathan Cape (2010)
 A State at Any Cost - The Life of David Ben-Gurion (Hebrew and German: 2018; English: 2019)

References

Further reading

 Israel & Palestine: Eternal Enmity? by Segev from The New York Review of Books

1945 births
Living people
Haaretz people
Hebrew University of Jerusalem alumni
Historians of the Middle East
Israeli historians
Israeli people of German-Jewish descent
Jewish historians
Jewish writers
New Historians
Post-Zionists